The Vietnamese government often groups the various provinces and municipalities into three regions: Northern Vietnam, Central Vietnam, and Southern Vietnam. These regions can be further subdivided into eight subregions: Northeast Vietnam, Northwest Vietnam, the Red River Delta, the North Central Coast, the South Central Coast, the Central Highlands, Southeast Vietnam, and the Mekong River Delta. These regions are not always used, and alternative classifications are possible. Other classifications used can be: Northern, Central, Southern, and Mekong.

List of regions and subregions

ǂ Municipality

Table of provinces per region

† Former province

1 – a.k.a. Greater Ha Noi (Hà Nội Kinh)

2 – a.k.a. Southwest Vietnam (Tây Nam Bo Việt Nam)

See also
 List of districts of Vietnam
 Municipalities of Vietnam
 Provinces of Vietnam
 Regions of Indonesia
 Regions of Thailand

 
Subdivisions of Vietnam
Regions